The Cheney Odd Fellows Hall in Cheney, Washington is a historic building that was built in 1904. It was listed on the National Register of Historic Places in 1990.

It was deemed "historically significant for its association with the community's leading fraternal organization in the early 20th century and is the best preserved example of vernacular commercial architecture from the period."  Its NRHP nomination describes it as having been "the venue of the community's most important social events and civic meetings. Today the building is a rare reminder of Cheney's public life during its formative years."

References

External links

Buildings and structures in Spokane County, Washington
Victorian architecture in Washington (state)
Odd Fellows buildings in Washington (state)
Clubhouses on the National Register of Historic Places in Washington (state)
National Register of Historic Places in Spokane County, Washington